Freddy Gow (18 December 1882 – 11 October 1961) was an Australian cricketer. He played seven first-class matches for New South Wales between 1909/10 and 1910/11.

See also
 List of New South Wales representative cricketers

References

External links
 

1882 births
1961 deaths
Australian cricketers
New South Wales cricketers
Cricketers from Sydney